Lawrence Young Scott (June 19, 1896 – February 15, 1977) was a Canadian professional ice hockey player from South River, Ontario who played 62 games in the National Hockey League and 106 games in the Western Canada Hockey League between 1922 and 1928. He played with the New York Rangers, New York Americans, and Saskatoon Sheiks.  

In 1928 Scott played 23 of 44 regular season games. His name was left off the Stanley Cup, because he was sent to the minors before the playoffs. The Rangers included Scott on the mid-season picture with the team, but not the Stanley Cup winning team picture.

Career statistics

Regular season and playoffs

References

External links
 

1896 births
1977 deaths
Canadian ice hockey forwards
Duluth Hornets players
Eveleth Rangers players
Ice hockey people from Ontario
New York Americans players
New York Rangers players
Oklahoma City Warriors (ice hockey) players
People from Parry Sound District
St. Louis Flyers (AHA) players
Saskatoon Sheiks players
Springfield Indians players